The Roosevelt Hotel was a hotel located in downtown Portland, Oregon at 1005 SW Park.  It was built in 1924 and is listed on the National Register of Historic Places.  In 2000–2001 the building was converted to condominiums.

The exterior facade of the building underwent restoration work in 2010.

See also
 National Register of Historic Places listings in Southwest Portland, Oregon

References

External links
 

1924 establishments in Oregon
Apartment buildings on the National Register of Historic Places in Portland, Oregon
Buildings designated early commercial in the National Register of Historic Places
Hotel buildings on the National Register of Historic Places in Portland, Oregon
Portland Historic Landmarks
Southwest Portland, Oregon